Chom Mok Kaeo is a village and tambon (subdistrict) of Mae Lao District, in Chiang Rai Province, Thailand. In 2005 it had a total population of 6165 people. The tambon contains 11 villages.

References

Tambon of Chiang Rai province
Populated places in Chiang Rai province